Beatrice Richter (born 20 December 1948 in Munich) is a German TV actress, comedian, cabaret artist and jazz singer.

Beatrice Richter concluded an acting education at the Otto Falckenberg School of the Performing Arts in Munich, which was followed by a jazz dance training under Frank Hatchett in New York.

She began her career with Diether Krebs and Klaus Havenstein at the side of Rudi Carrell in the Radio Bremen comedy program , which ran from 1981 till 1987. For her parody performances she was awarded the Goldene Kamera in 1982. She gained further recognition as partner of Diether Krebs in the sketch comedy serial Sketchup (Bayerischer Rundfunk, 1984–1986), her role was later taken over by Iris Berben. Beatrice Richter furthermore starred in several films with among others Walter Giller and Peter Alexander and also appeared in theater plays. In 1989 she was seen in the episode "Hilfe eine Aushilfe!" ("Help a temp!") of the television series Meister Eder und sein Pumuckl. Since 1996 she entertained, also as a singer, in her own jazz cabaret show.

In 2004 she appeared on stage with Peter Schmidt-Pavloff, Johannes Heesters, Cordula Trantow and Fred Alexander in Hugo von Hofmannsthal's play Jedermann in front of the Cologne Cathedral. There she played the roles of the Journeyman, the Devil and the Mammon.
In 2008 she played the role of Rosmathilda Polterman at the Karl May Festival in Bad Segeberg.

Photos of her appeared in the August 1982 edition of the German Playboy magazine.

She is the mother of actress Judith Richter (born 1978), who originates from a temporary relationship with the actor Heinz Baumann.

Selected filmography

 1971: Der kopflose Falke 
 1977: 
 1981: Trokadero
 1983: 
 1983: 
 1983: The Roaring Fifties
 1984: Beautiful Wilhelmine 
 1984/1985: Sketchup
 1985: 
 1987: Derrick
 1988: The Black Forest Clinic 
 1989: Der Landarzt
 1989: Meister Eder und sein Pumuckl
 1989: The Adventures of Dr. Bayer
 1990–2008: The Old Fox
 1994: Salto Postale
 1995: Tatort
 2003: Das bisschen Haushalt
 2005: Leipzig Homicide 
 2007/2008: In aller Freundschaft
 2008: Siska 
 2009: SOKO 5113
 2009: Da kommt Kalle
 2009: Großstadtrevier 
 2012: München 7

References

External links 
 

German television actresses
20th-century German actresses
21st-century German actresses
German women singers
1948 births
Living people